Afrocanthium is a genus of flowering plants in the family Rubiaceae. It consists of deciduous, unarmed trees, and shrubs. They are native to East Africa, from Sudan and Ethiopia to South Africa.

Taxonomy
Afrocanthium was first recognized as a distinct group in 1991, when it was named as a subgenus of Canthium. It was described and compared to the other subgenera in 1992. In 2004, a molecular phylogenetic study of DNA sequences showed that Afrocanthium is monophyletic and not most closely related to the other subgenera of Canthium. The authors of this study raised Afrocanthium, unaltered, to generic status. It is sister to Keetia, a genus that was segregated from Canthium in 1986.

Species

 Afrocanthium burttii (Bullock) Lantz
 Afrocanthium gilfillanii (N.E.Br.) Lantz
 Afrocanthium keniense (Bullock) Lantz
 Afrocanthium kilifiense (Bridson) Lantz
 Afrocanthium lactescens (Hiern) Lantz
 Afrocanthium mundianum (Cham. & Schltdl.) Lantz
 Afrocanthium ngonii (Bridson) Lantz
 Afrocanthium parasiebenlistii (Bridson) Lantz
 Afrocanthium peteri (Bridson) Lantz
 Afrocanthium pseudorandii (Bridson) Lantz
 Afrocanthium pseudoverticillatum (S.Moore) Lantz
 Afrocanthium racemulosum (S.Moore) Lantz
 Afrocanthium rondoense (Bridson) Lantz
 Afrocanthium salubenii (Bridson) Lantz
 Afrocanthium shabanii (Bridson) Lantz
 Afrocanthium siebenlistii (K.Krause) Lantz
 Afrocanthium vollesenii (Bridson) Lantz

References

External links 
Afrocanthium in the World Checklist of Rubiaceae

Rubiaceae genera
Vanguerieae
Taxa named by Birgitta Bremer
Taxa named by Diane Mary Bridson